Fabio de Sousa Silva (born 30 January 1996) is a Brazilian footballer who last played for Swedish club Örebro SK.

References

1996 births
Living people
Brazilian footballers
Örebro SK players
Vasalunds IF players
Dalkurd FF players
Allsvenskan players
Ettan Fotboll players
Superettan players
Association football defenders
Brazilian expatriate footballers
Expatriate footballers in Sweden
Brazilian expatriate sportspeople in Sweden